Ebony Satala (born 15 June 1989) is a Fijian rugby union player.

Biography 
Satala began playing rugby in Australia at the age of 22. Her father hails from the chiefly village of Namoli in Lautoka and is a cousin of former Flying Fijian Viliame Satala. She made her Fijiana sevens debut at the France Sevens in the final leg of the 2016–17 Sevens Series.

Satala made her international debut for the Fijiana XV's against Australia on 6 May 2022 at Suncorp Stadium.

References 

1989 births
Living people
Female rugby union players
Fijian female rugby union players
Fiji women's international rugby union players
Fiji international women's rugby sevens players